Joseph Edward Harry (b. October 1, 1863 ) briefly served an interim term as president of the University of Cincinnati between Presidents Howard Ayers and Charles W. Dabney in 1904. Harry was dean of the college of Arts and Sciences from 1901 to 1906 and was dean of the Graduate School in 1916.

External links
 
 University of Cincinnati Archives and Rare Books

 

1863 births
Year of death missing
University of Cincinnati faculty
Presidents of the University of Cincinnati